Arizona v. Youngblood, 488 U.S. 51 (1988), is a United States Supreme Court case concerning the limits of Constitutional due process in criminal law.

Background 
A boy was molested and sodomized. The rape kit was preserved in a refrigerator, but the boy's clothes (containing samples of the assailant's semen) were not preserved in a refrigeration unit. At a later date, criminalists were unable to do testing on the clothing because it had deteriorated as a result of not being refrigerated. The boy picked the defendant out of a photo lineup as his assailant.

Next, the case developed as follows:

The defendant claimed that the state disposed of potentially exculpatory evidence by not properly preserving the evidence.

Opinion of the Court 
The Supreme Court held that there was no constitutional violation in this case. In the Court's holding, it stated: “[w]e therefore hold that unless a criminal defendant can show bad faith on the part of the police, failure to preserve potentially useful evidence does not constitute a denial of due process of law.” The Court relied on United States v. Marion, United States v. Lovasco, and other cases for its reasoning.

Subsequent developments 
On remand to the Arizona Court of Appeals, the court again reversed on state law grounds.

In 2000, on request from Youngblood's attorneys, the police department tested the degraded evidence using new, sophisticated DNA technology. Those results exonerated Youngblood, and he was released from prison in August 2000, and charges were dismissed.

Shortly thereafter, the DNA profile from the evidence was entered into the national convicted offender databases. In early 2001, officials got a hit, matching the profile of Walter Cruise, who was then serving time in Texas on unrelated charges. In August 2002, Cruise was convicted of the crime and sentenced to twenty-four years in prison.

See also 
 Miranda v. Arizona (1966)
 Due Process Clause
 List of United States Supreme Court cases, volume 488
 List of United States Supreme Court cases
 Lists of United States Supreme Court cases by volume
 List of United States Supreme Court cases by the Rehnquist Court

References

External links
 

United States Supreme Court cases
United States Supreme Court cases of the Rehnquist Court
1988 in United States case law
Brady material case law
1988 in Arizona
Legal history of Arizona